The Hungarian Cup is the national ice hockey cup competition in Hungary.

Champions

References

External links 
  Hungarian Ice Hockey Federation

Cup
National ice hockey cup competitions in Europe